Braulio Roncero (3 March 1951 – 27 July 2018) was a Spanish born Dutch professional darts player, who played in Professional Darts Corporation events.

Career
From Extremadura, Spain. Roncero played in the 1994 Winmau World Masters, but who lost Andy Jenkins of England.

Roncero (whilst representing the Netherlands) played in one BDO World Darts Championships in 1998, losing 3–1 to Bobby George and played in one PDC World Darts Championships in 2000, losing 3–2 to Dennis Priestley.

Although he was Spanish by birth, Roncero played for the Dutch team. Here he played regularly with Raymond van Barneveld.

Roncero died on July 27, 2018.

World Championship performances results

BDO
 1998: Last 32: (lost to Bobby George 1–3) (sets)

PDC
 2000: Last 32: (lost to Dennis Priestley 2–3)

References

External links

1951 births
2018 deaths
Spanish darts players
Dutch darts players
Professional Darts Corporation associate players
British Darts Organisation players